Noel Campbell (1920–1985) was a famous Irish sportsperson.  He played hurling with his local club Mitchel's and with the Antrim senior inter-county team in the 1942 and 1954.

External links
 Antrim GAA honours

1920 births
1985 deaths
Mitchel's hurlers
Antrim inter-county hurlers
Sportspeople from Belfast